Matthew James Green (born 2 January 1987) is an English professional footballer who last played as a striker for Yate Town.

Green started his senior career at Conference South club Newport County in 2005, having been released from Bristol City's youth academy. He made 56 league appearances for Newport County in a two-season spell at the club, before joining Championship side Cardiff City in January 2007. Having made six appearances for Cardiff during the 2006–07 season, he had three loan spells away from the club the following season: one at League Two club Darlington in October 2007, where he made five appearances, and two for Conference Premier side Oxford United, where he made 21 appearances.

Having been released by Cardiff at the end of the 2007–08 season, he switched to Conference side Torquay United in May 2008. He made 29 league appearances for Torquay during the 2008–09 season, but joined Oxford United for a third loan spell the following season. Having made 41 league appearances for Oxford during the 2009–10 season, he signed a permanent deal with the club, where he made a further 17 appearances. He spent the latter half of the 2010–11 season on loan to League Two side Cheltenham Town, where he made 19 league appearances and then joined Conference side Mansfield Town in July 2011, initially on loan, but permanently from January 2012 onwards. He made 87 league appearances for Mansfield, scoring 54 goals, before signing for Championship club Birmingham City, where he spent two seasons, one-and-a-half of which were lost to injury. He returned to Mansfield, where he was nearly ever-present for two seasons, then spent 18 months at Lincoln City, with whom he won the 2017–18 EFL Trophy, before signing for Salford City in December 2018. He joined Grimsby Town in June 2019 where he remained for two seasons, and then joined Linfield.

Club career

Early career
Born in Bath, Somerset, Green was a member of the Bristol City youth programme but was released by the club as they deemed he was too small to play professional football. An England schoolboy international, Green went on to join the Cirencester Academy under the direction of former Newport County and Welsh international player Steve Lowndes who recommended him to Newport in the 2005 close season. A pacey striker, he made a big impact in his first season, making 30 appearances for the Newport County first team in all competitions. He was a part-time player at Newport and worked full-time at a nearby car auction warehouse before he began to attract interest.

Several teams watched him while he played for Newport, including Bristol City, Reading, Stoke City and Swansea City, but instead Green joined Cardiff City in January 2007 for a fee of £10,000 with possible add-ons depending on appearances. Green had played alongside several former Cardiff players at Newport including Nathan Blake, Jason Bowen and Damon Searle. Green made his debut for his new club against Preston North End on 23 February, coming on for the final few minutes as a substitute for Michael Chopra in Cardiff's 4–1 home win. He made five further appearances, all as a substitute, later that season. At the start of the 2007–08 season Green was included in a two-game pre-season tour of Portugal where he made appearances in both games, scoring in one. He also appeared as a substitute in Cardiff's first-round League Cup win at home to Brighton & Hove Albion.

In October 2007 Green signed a one-month loan deal at League Two club Darlington. He made his debut for Darlington on 9 October against Leeds United in the Football League Trophy. He started the match on the bench, but was brought on earlier than planned due to the injury of teammate Tommy Wright. He hit the post late in the game as Leeds won 1–0. He returned to Cardiff on 8 November after making five appearances in all competitions for Darlington.

He joined Oxford United on an emergency one-month loan on 22 November and scored on his debut two days later against Kidderminster Harriers. He made two further appearances for Oxford during his loan spell, an FA Cup draw at home to Southend United and in the Conference Premier defeat away to Northwich Victoria, before suffering a broken collarbone and returning to Cardiff for treatment.

He rejoined Oxford on 25 January 2008 on loan until the end of the season. He scored twice in the 3–0 home win against Histon on 9 February, and went on to make a total of 18 appearances before returning to Cardiff where he was released on his return.

Despite Oxford's interest in taking Green on a permanent deal, and suggestions from manager Darren Patterson that the player had verbally agreed to sign, on 31 May he signed for Conference rivals Torquay United. Green began the season on the bench for Torquay, making regular substitute appearances, and on 23 September he scored his first goal for the club with a late winner away to Forest Green Rovers. On 3 January 2009, he scored the only goal of the game as Torquay eliminated Championship team Blackpool in the FA Cup third round.

Green rejoined Oxford on loan for the 2009–10 season. He was named in the England C squad to face a Polish under-23 team in November, but had to withdraw with an ankle injury.

He helped Oxford finish third in the Conference, scoring 10 goals. On 16 May 2010, he scored the opening goal at Wembley Stadium as Oxford defeated York City 3–1 in the 2010 Conference Premier play-off Final to return to the Football League after a four-year exile. He signed a two-year contract with Oxford on 2 June; the fee was undisclosed. On 31 January 2011, he signed on loan at Cheltenham Town until the end of the season.

Mansfield Town

On 22 July 2011, it was announced that Green would be joining Mansfield Town on loan until 31 December of the same year, with £2,000 donated towards the transfer by fans' group The 12th Stag. He was an immediate hit, scoring 14 goals in 25 appearances, and signed an 18-month contract with the club on 1 January 2012. He scored on his first day as a permanent Mansfield player in a 2–2 away draw with York City, and went on to score 56 goals in just 92 appearances for the club in the Conference.

Birmingham City
After a trial with Championship club Birmingham City in May 2013, Green signed a two-year contract with the club on 3 July 2013. He scored his first goal for the club against Shamrock Rovers during a pre-season tour of Ireland, but was then knocked unconscious in a challenge and received eight minutes of treatment before being stretchered off. He made his competitive debut in a 1–0 defeat at home to Watford on 3 August, and his first competitive goal for the club opened the scoring in a 3–2 defeat at Leicester City three weeks later. Green scored the second goal, "a superb right-foot finish at the back post" from Mitch Hancox's cross, as Birmingham beat holders Swansea City 3–1 in the third round of the League Cup. He started the next three games, without scoring, but was omitted from the matchday squad thereafter. In early November, Green damaged cruciate ligaments in training and was expected to miss the rest of the season. His recovery was beset by complications, and he finally regained fitness towards the end of the 2014–15 season, making appearances for the development squad and scoring in the Birmingham Senior Cup final. The club confirmed he would be released when his contract expired.

Return to Mansfield Town
Following his release by Birmingham, Green returned to Mansfield Town on 22 May 2015. He scored a header against Carlisle United to keep Mansfield's hopes of promotion alive. This goal proved to be his last for Mansfield. He was released by Mansfield at the end of the 2016–17 season.

Lincoln City
On 27 June 2017, Green signed a two-year contract with newly promoted League Two side Lincoln City. He scored his first goal for Lincoln on his debut in a 2–2 draw with Wycombe Wanderers on the opening day of the season. Green finished the season as Lincoln's top scorer, with 17 goals from 56 appearances in all competitions, as his team reached the play-offs, in which they lost to Exeter City on aggregate despite Green's lively performance in the first leg and goal in the second. He contributed three goals to their run to the 2018 EFL Trophy Final, and played almost the whole of the matchhe was substituted deep into stoppage timeas Lincoln beat League One club Shrewsbury Town 1–0. After the club made John Akindea similar style of playertheir record signing in the close season, Green found himself out of the starting eleven. By mid-December he had made 19 league appearances, of which 17 were from the bench.

Salford City
Lincoln accepted an undisclosed offer from National League club Salford City, and Green signed a two-and-a-half-year contract on 20 December 2018. He scored four goals from 21 appearances as Salford reached the Play-Offs, but was sent off in the last match of the season so missed out on the club's promotion to the Football League. He left the club at the end of the season.

Grimsby Town
On 10 June 2019, Green joined League Two club Grimsby Town on a two-year contract. On 25 September, Green scored Grimsby's only goal in a defeat to Chelsea in the third round of the EFL Cup. A long ball caught out the Chelsea defence and Green scored with a volley in the 19th minute to make the score 2–1 to Chelsea, who went on to win 7–1.

Green scored eight goals from 66 appearances in all competitions over two seasons, and was released when his contract expired at the end of the 2020–21 season.

Linfield
Green signed for NIFL Premiership club Linfield in August 2021. He scored five goals from 17 appearances in all competitions before his contract was terminated by mutual consent in late December.

Gloucester City
On 21 January 2022, Green signed for National League North side Gloucester City.

Yate Town
On 17 July 2022, Green dropped down a division to join Southern League Premier Division South club Yate Town.

International career
Green was capped once by the England national C team, in a 1–1 draw with Hungary on 15 September 2009.

Career statistics

Honours
Oxford United
Conference Premier play-offs: 2010

Mansfield Town
Conference Premier: 2012–13

Lincoln City
EFL League Two: 2018–19
EFL Trophy: 2017–18

Individual
Conference Premier Team of the Year: 2012–13 
Conference Premier Golden Boot: 2012–13

References

External links

Player profile at Mansfield Town F.C.'s website

1987 births
Living people
Sportspeople from Bath, Somerset
English footballers
England semi-pro international footballers
Association football forwards
Bristol City F.C. players
Newport County A.F.C. players
Cardiff City F.C. players
Darlington F.C. players
Oxford United F.C. players
Gloucester City A.F.C. players
Cheltenham Town F.C. players
Torquay United F.C. players
Mansfield Town F.C. players
Birmingham City F.C. players
Lincoln City F.C. players
Salford City F.C. players
Grimsby Town F.C. players
Linfield F.C. players
Yate Town F.C. players
National League (English football) players
English Football League players
NIFL Premiership players
Black British sportsmen